The European Institute for Computer Antivirus Research (EICAR) was founded in 1991 as an organization aiming to further antivirus research and improving development of antivirus software. Recently EICAR has furthered its scope to include the research of malicious software (malware) other than computer viruses and extended work on other information security topics like content security, Wireless LAN security, RFID and information security awareness. EICAR also organizes international security conferences most years, as well as a number of working groups or 'task forces'.

Acronym

"EICAR" was originally an abbreviation for "European Institute for Computer Antivirus Research", but the organisation no longer uses that full title, and now regards "EICAR" as a self-standing name, as it has expanded into a broader range of IT Security work than just antivirus research.

EICAR test file

EICAR, in collaboration with CARO (Computer AntiVirus Research Organization), developed the EICAR test file: a harmless executable string, designed to test the integrity of antivirus software.

See also
 Anti-Malware Testing Standards Organization

References

External links
 EICAR Home Page

Antivirus software
Information technology organizations based in Europe
Computer security organizations